Corse is the French name for Corsica, a large island in the Mediterranean Sea. It may also refer to:

Places
 , a former department of France (1790–1793, 1811–1976)
 Cap Corse, a peninsula in northern Corsica
 Corse, Gloucestershire, England, a village

Vessels
 , a French Navy troopship sunk in World War I
 MS Corse (1966), the former name of the MS Express Samina passenger ferry
 , a French cruise ferry operated by SNCM
 Corse (ship), a French Navy ship commissioned in 1850

People
 Corse (surname), a European surname of multiple origins (and a list of people with that name)

Other uses
 Corse Castle in Scotland
 Opération Corse, the start of an abbreviated civil war that precipitated the fall of the Fourth French Republic in 1958

See also 
 Corse-du-Sud, a French department
 Haute-Corse, a French department
 Corsa (disambiguation)